Ronan Curtis (born 29 March 1996) is an Irish professional footballer who plays as a left-winger for League One side Portsmouth and the Republic of Ireland.

Curtis started his career with Derry City in 2015, spending four seasons there and amassing 100 appearances and 24 goals. He agreed a deal with Portsmouth in May 2018 and joined the South Coast club for a fee believed to be approximately £100,000. In March 2019, he won his first senior honour, the EFL Trophy.

He represented Ireland at under-21 level before making his senior debut in November 2018 in a 0–0 draw against Northern Ireland.

Club career

Derry City
Curtis moved to Derry City's academy in 2014, after playing for Kildrum Tigers and Swilly Rovers. He made his senior debut for the club on 8 May 2015, coming on as a second-half substitute in a 2–0 home loss against Galway United.

Curtis scored his first goal for Derry on 30 October 2015, netting his team's first in a 4–2 away loss against Longford Town. On 25 November, he signed a two-year contract extension, and scored a brace in a 2–2 home draw against Shamrock Rovers on 27 September of the following year.

On 19 February 2017, Curtis signed a new contract extension with the Candystripes. He finished the campaign with eight goals in 32 appearances, and had a move to Swedish side Östersunds FK cancelled in August after failing to agree personal terms.

On 7 May 2018, amid high interest from Portsmouth, Curtis scored a hat-trick in a 7–3 home routing of Shelbourne, taking his side to the semi-finals of the League of Ireland Cup.

Portsmouth
On 22 May 2018, League One side Portsmouth agreed a deal to sign Curtis from Derry City, for a transfer fee in the region of £100,000 on a two-year contract. Curtis made his English Football League debut at Fratton Park on 4 August, playing the full 90 minutes of a 1–0 victory over Luton Town. A week later, he scored his first two goals in a 2–1 win at Blackpool. On 31 March 2019, he won his first piece of silverware when Portsmouth won the 2018–19 EFL Trophy, defeating Sunderland 5–4 on penalties following a 2–2 draw after extra time.

On 20 August 2019, Curtis scored his first goal of the new season in a 3–3 home draw against Coventry City with a header in the tenth minute.

On 12 January 2021, Portsmouth announced that Curtis had tested positive for COVID-19 ahead of his club's FA Cup Third Round Proper game against Bristol City. The striker later spoke of the effect the illness had on his breathing, as well as his sleep pattern and dreaming.

International career
Although born in England, Curtis grew up in St Johnston, Donegal and has represented the Republic of Ireland at under-21 and senior level. On 7 September 2018, Curtis scored his first international goal in a 1–1 draw against Kosovo in the UEFA Under-21 Championship qualifying stage.

Received the ROI under 21's player of the year 2018  Shane Duffy and Ronan Curtis pick up FAI Player of the Year Awards

On 9 September 2018, Curtis was called up to the senior Republic of Ireland squad for the friendly match against Poland two days later, in which he was an unused substitute. He was again added to the Ireland squad on 14 October for a UEFA Nations League encounter against Wales. He made his full Ireland debut on 15 November 2018, coming on as a half-time substitute for Callum O'Dowda in a goalless friendly against Northern Ireland at the Aviva Stadium.

Personal life
Curtis was born in London but moved to Donegal, Ireland when he was ten. He is the godson of Chris Coleman, who played for and managed Wales. Curtis supported Arsenal while growing up, but also watched Crystal Palace games. Curtis's mother is from Derry and his grandfather is from Cork, meaning Curtis was eligible to play for England, the Republic of Ireland or Northern Ireland until making his competitive Ireland debut against Denmark in Aarhus in November 2018. Curtis is the youngest of 11 siblings.

Career statistics

Club

International

Honours
Portsmouth
EFL Trophy: 2018–19; runner-up: 2019–20

References

External links

Profile at the Portsmouth F.C. website

1996 births
Living people
Footballers from Greater London
Republic of Ireland association footballers
Republic of Ireland youth international footballers
Republic of Ireland international footballers
Association football wingers
Association football forwards
League of Ireland players
Kildrum Tigers F.C. players
Swilly Rovers F.C. players
Derry City F.C. players
Portsmouth F.C. players
English Football League players